The 2021–22 Pepperdine Waves men's basketball team represented Pepperdine University during the 2021–22 NCAA Division I men's basketball season. The Waves were led by head coach Lorenzo Romar, in the fourth season of his second stint after coaching the Waves from 1996 to 1999. They played their home games at the Firestone Fieldhouse in Malibu, California as members of the West Coast Conference.

Previous season
In a season limited due to the ongoing COVID-19 pandemic, the Waves finished the 2020–21 season 15–12, 7–6 in WCC play to finish in fourth place. They defeated Santa Clara in the quarterfinals of the WCC tournament before losing in the semifinals to BYU. They received an invitation to College Basketball Invitational where they defeated Longwood, Bellarmine, and Coastal Carolina to win the tournament.

Offseason

Departures

Incoming transfers

Recruiting classes

2021 recruiting class

2022 recruiting class

Roster

}}

Schedule and results

|-
!colspan=9 style=| Exhibition

|-
!colspan=9 style=| Non conference regular season

|-
!colspan=9 style=| WCC regular season

|-
!colspan=9 style=| WCC tournament

Source

References

Pepperdine Waves men's basketball seasons
Pepperdine
Pepperdine
Pepperdine